The 1899 Kentucky Derby was the 25th running of the Kentucky Derby. The race took place on May 4, 1899.

Full results

Winning Breeder: Bashford Manor Stud; (KY)

Payout
 The winner received a purse of $4,850.
 Second place received $700.
 Third place received $300.

References

1899
Kentucky Derby
Derby
May 1899 sports events
1899 in American sports